Austropleuropholis is an extinct genus of ray-finned fish that lived during the early Toarcian stage of the Early Jurassic epoch.

See also
 List of prehistoric bony fish genera

References

Prehistoric ray-finned fish genera
Early Jurassic fish